Buissy is a commune in the Pas-de-Calais department in the Hauts-de-France region in northern France.

Geography
A farming village located 15 miles (24 km) southeast of Arras on the D14 road, at the junction with the D19.

Population

Sights
 The church of St. Médard, dating from the sixteenth century
 The Quéant Road Cemetery, overseen by the Commonwealth War Graves Commission.

See also
Communes of the Pas-de-Calais department

References

External links

 The CWGC cemetery at Quent Road, Buissy

Communes of Pas-de-Calais